Tajikistan national amateur boxing athletes represents the Tajikistan in regional, continental and world tournaments and matches sanctioned by the Amateur International Boxing Association (AIBA).

Olympics

Asian Games

References

Amateur boxing
Boxing, Amateur
Boxing in Tajikistan